EgoPo Classic Theater is a Philadelphia-based nonprofit repertory theater specializing in performing "Classic Theater on the Edge," often producing works of a collaborative nature that incorporates original music, dance, and masks. It was founded in 1991 in San Francisco by Lane Savadove who remains the company's Artistic Director.  EgoPo  has staged over two dozen productions and hundreds of performances in Philadelphia, New York, New Orleans, Chicago, Washington D.C., and internationally, in Indonesia and Croatia. A volunteer Board of Directors governs EgoPo. EgoPo is headquartered at 1219 Vine Street, Philadelphia, PA 19107.

EgoPo’s History
EgoPo, whose name is derived from the French concept "The Physical-Self," was begun in San Francisco in 1991, as a theater company as well as an acting style. EgoPo moved operations to New Orleans in 2002, and built a new theatrical home, the Jewel Theater. The theater opened with a half-masked, expressionistic version of Frank Wedekind’s masterpiece, Spring Awakening (play). The production experienced a six-week sold-out run and garnered many awards. Also notable was a production of Company (see Company by Samuel Beckett).

On August 27, 2005, the EgoPo company arrived in Philadelphia to begin technical rehearsals for a production of The Maids x 2, a ground-breaking version of Jean Genet’s classic, The Maids. Three days later EgoPo became known as Philadelphia’s "stranded theater company."  EgoPo lost its theater to Hurricane Katrina, most company members lost their homes, and their funding base was gone.

An outpouring of financial and emotional support from the Philadelphia theater community, including The Pew Charitable Trusts, The Philadelphia Live Arts Festival and Philly Fringe, and the Arden Theater Co., enabled EgoPo to permanently relocate to Philadelphia. In February 2006, EgoPo staged The Maids x 2 Off Broadway at the Bouwerie Lane Theater.

In 2007, EgoPo began its new life as a Philadelphia company with a restaging of its Barrymore-nominated production of Spring Awakening at the Mainstage of the Adrienne Theater and restarted its professional conservatory.

Since that time, EgoPo has produced the Tennessee Williams’ Festival, and the Expressionism Festival, including the Burns’ Classic Reading Series, during which EgoPo united ten other Philadelphia-based theater companies for the yearlong event. The 2009-2010 season featured a yearlong Philadelphia Beckett Festival, including three mainstage performances and a dozen short Beckett plays presented at the Painted Bride Art Center.

Since their relocation to Philadelphia, EgoPo has become known for its themed seasons which allow for a much deeper audience engagement than normal artistic programming allows.  For the 2010-11 season, EgoPo produced a year-long "Theater of Cruelty Festival", the first season investigating the theory and work of Antonin Artaud since Peter Brook produced a similar season with the Royal Shakespeare Festival in 1964. This season featured an interactive cabaret production of four world premier adaptations of Artaud's writing, as well as a version of Peter Weiss' Marat Sade in West Philly's historic Rotunda, and a world premier adaptation of Henri Barbusse's Hell (L'Enfer).  For the 2011-12 season, EgoPo produced a year-long "Jewish Theater Festival" including an environmental production of Anne Frank, a world-premier version of the Golem, and the Philadelphia premier of Tony Kushner's Dybbuk.  For audience engagement, EgoPo is holding public Passover Seders and presented the Auschwitz trial documentary The Investigation.

Awards
EgoPo's awards include: two Barrymore Nominations for Outstanding Sound Design/Original Music and Outstanding Music Director. "Best Production of 2000" in New York by Backstage, two Big Easy nominations, five Storer Boone nominations, one Ambie Award, nine Marquee Nominations, six Louisiana Theater Festival Awards, and two Barrymore Awards for Excellence in Theater nominations.

EgoPo's renowned productions include a 72-hour performance in the Nevada Desert commissioned by the Desert Siteworks Project. and a commission from National Public Radio to adapt Beckett's prose Company, which was broadcast nationally, then went on to a yearlong run in three cities, and was awarded "Best Play of 2000".

Recent notable productions are: Waiting for Godot, Endgame, Company,  Bluebird, Woyzeck, and Spring Awakening.

Recent productions 

2015-2016 Production Calendar, The American Giants II: The Women Festival

The Children's Hour by Lillian Hellman
Directed by: Adrienne Mackey
Ran from October 7–25, 2015
The Latvian Society Theater, 531 N. 7th St. Philadelphia, PA

The Women by Clare Boothe Luce
Directed by: Lane Savadove
Ran from March 3–20, 2016
The Latvian Society Theater, 531 N. 7th St. Philadelphia, PA

Machinal by Sophie Treadwell
Directed by: Brenna Geffers
Ran from April 20-May 8, 2016
The Latvian Society Theater, 531 N. 7th St. Philadelphia, PA

Trifles by Susan Glaspell: A powerful American short play
Directed by: Dan Kern
A special event, this private showing was open to EgoPo Bronze subscribers and up.

2014-2015 Production Calendar, The American Giants Festival

Death of a Salesman by Arthur Miller
Directed by: Lane Savadove
Ran from October 22-November 9, 2014
The Latvian Society, Theater 531 N. 7th St. Philadelphia, PA

Stairs to the Roof by Tennessee Williams
Directed by: Lane Savadove
Ran from February 11-March 1, 2015
The Latvian Society Theater, 531 N. 7th St. Philadelphia, PA

The Hairy Ape by Eugene O'Neill
Directed by: Lane Savadove
Ran from April 8–26, 2015
The Latvian Society Theater, 531 N. 7th St. Philadelphia, PA

2013-2014 Production Calendar, The Henrik Ibsen Festival

A Doll's House: A one-woman adaptation created by Brenna Geffers
Directed by: Brenna Geffers
September 4–22, 2013, ran for 14 performances
Playground Space at The Adrienne Theater, 2030 Sansom St. Philadelphia, PA

The Lady from the Sea: sponsored by the Jacob Burns Foundation
Directed by: Brenna Geffers
February 19-March 2, 2014, runs for 12 performance
Christ Church Neighborhood House, 20 North American St. Philadelphia, PA 
Tickets available at EgoPo's website. 

GINT: Romulus Linney's adaptation of Peer Gynt
Directed by: Lane Savadove
April 30-May 11, 2014, runs for 12 performances
Christ Church Neighborhood House, 20 North American St. Philadelphia, PA 
Tickets available at EgoPo's website. 

2012-2013 Production Calendar, American Vaudeville Festival

The Assassination of Jesse James: created by Brenna Geffers
Directed by: Brenna Geffers
Oct 3-Oct 21 2012, ran for 18 performances
Plays and Players Theatre, 1714 Delancey Pl. Philadelphia, PA

The Life (and Death) of Harry Houdini: created by Brenna Geffers
Directed by: Brenna Geffers
March 27-April 7, 2013, ran for 15 performances
Plays and Players Theater, 1714 Delancey Pl. Philadelphia, PA

Uncle Tom's Cabin:An Unfortunate History: adapted by Lane Savadove and Glenn Odom
Directed by: Lane Savadove
Choreographed by: Paule Turner
May 29-June 9, 2013, ran for 13 performances.
Plays and Players Theater, 1714 Delancey Pl. Philadelphia, PA

2011-2012 Production Calendar, Festival of Jewish Theater

The Diary of Anne Frank: by Frances Goodrich and Albert Hackett
Adapted by: Wendy Kesselman
Directed by: Lane Savadove
Oct 20- Nov 6 2011, ran for 14 performances
The Prince Music Theater, 1412 Chestnut Street, Philadelphia

The Golem: A World Premiere Ensemble Creation
Directed by: Brenna Geffers
March 29-April 15, 2012, ran for 14 performances
The Prince Music Theater, 1412 Chestnut Street, Philadelphia

A Dybbuk: translated from S. Ansky by Joachim Neugroschel
Adapted by: Tony Kushner
Directed by: Lane Savadove
May 31- June 17, 2012, runs for 14 performances
The Prince Music Theater, 1412 Chestnut Street, Philadelphia

2010-2011 Production Calendar, Theater of Cruelty Festival

Marat Sade: by Peter Weiss
Directed by Brenna Geffers
Sept. 3-Sept. 18 2010, ran for 13 performances
The Sanctuary at The Rotunda, 4014 Walnut Street, Philadelphia

Artaud Unbound: by Antonin Artaud
Thirty Two: conceived and directed by Lane Savadove
The Butcher's Revolution: conceived and directed by Brenna Geffers
To Have Done with the Judgment of God: conceived and directed by Mat Wright
Manifestos and the Spurt of Blood: conceived and directed by Michael Alltop
Feb 16-Feb 20 2011, ran for 6 performances
The Latvian Society 531 N 7th Street, Philadelphia

Hell: based on the novel written by Henri Barbusse
Directed by Lane Savadove
April 27- May 15, 2011, ran for 15 performances
The German Society, 611 Spring Garden Street, Philadelphia.

2009-2010 Production Calendar, Samuel Beckett Festival

Company (see Company), by Samuel Beckett, in a new adaptation by EgoPo.
Directed by Lane Savadove
Sept. 4-Sept 26th, 2009, ran for 24 performances
Filmtech, 2019 S. Juniper Street, Philadelphia

Endgame, by Samuel Beckett
Directed by Lane Savadove
Oct. 30-Nov. 15th, 2009, ran for 14 performances
St. Stephen's Theater, 10th and Ludlow, Philadelphia

Waiting for Godot, by Samuel Beckett, directed by Brenna Geffers, The Latvian Society, 531 N. 7th Street, Philadelphia.

Jacob Burns and Herb and Rosalie Goldberg Foundation SIdeshow Series, featuring one-night-only full stagings of Beckett Short plays, at the Painted Bride, 230 Vine Street, Philadelphia
REWIND: Krapp’s Last Tape directed by Ryder Thorton and Ohio Impromptu directed by Brenna Geffers, Jan 11th, 2009
STAGES: Cascando and Words and Music directed by Mat Wright, Catastrophe directed by Joe Canuso, What Where directed by Ryder Thornton, Not I directed by Brenna Geffers, April 12, 2009.
REMEMBERING WOMEN: Rockaby directed by Allison Heishman, Footfalls and Play, directed by Lane Savadove, Come and Go directed by Charlie DelMarcelle., May 10, 2009.

2008-2009 Production Calendar, The Expressionist theater Festival

Woyzeck by Georg Buchner, translated by Nicholas Rudall
Directed by Brenna Geffers, September 11–26, 2008, ran for 16 performances
Pennsylvania German Society, 611 Spring Garden Street, Philadelphia PA 19123

Spring Awakening by Frank Wedekind, translated by Douglas Langworthy
Directed by Lane Savadove
December 13, 2008, ran for 1 performance
Annenberg Center for the Performing Arts, 3680 Walnut Street, Philadelphia PA 19104

Bluebird, by Maurice Maeterlinck, in a new adaptation by EgoPo Productions, featuring live orchestration by Orchestra 2001
Directed by Lane Savadove
April 25- May 10, 2009, ran for 12 performances
Mandell Theater at Drexel University, 33rd and Chestnut Streets, Philadelphia PA 19104

Jacob Burns Foundation Classic Reading Series, featuring one-night-only staged readings of expressionist plays, at the Ethical Society of Philadelphia, 1906 Rittenhouse Square, Philadelphia
Zastrozzi: Master of Discipline, by George Walker, directed by the Lantern Theater, October 20, 2008
The Ghost Sonata, by August Strindberg, directed by the Wilma Theater, November 3, 2008
Anna Christie, by Eugene O’Neill, directed by Kaibutsu, December 1, 2008
Baal, by Bertolt Brecht, directed by Wandering Rom, January 5, 2009
Gint, by Romulus Linney, adapted from Ibsen's Peer Gynt, directed by EgoPo Productions, February 2, 2009
Great God Brown, by Eugene O’Neill, directed by EgoPo Productions, March 9, 2009
The Caucasian Chalk Circle, by Bertolt Brecht, directed by Flashpoint Theatre, April 6, 2009
Machinal, by Sophie Treadwell, directed by Azuka Theatre, May 4, 2009
The Hairy Ape, by Eugene O’Neill, directed by Theatre Exile, June 1, 2009

2007-2008 Production Calendar, The Tennessee Williams Festival

Vieux Carré by Tennessee Williams
Directed by Lane Savadove, featuring original music by the Daniel T. Peterson Jazz Ensemble
December 5–22, 2007, ran for 14 performances
Christ Church Neighborhood House, 20 N. American Street, Philadelphia PA 19106

Something Cloudy, Something Clear by Tennessee Williams
Directed by Brenna Geffers
March 1–22, 2008, ran for 16 performances
Adrienne Theater Mainstage, 2030 Sansom Street, Philadelphia PA 19103

Jacob Burns Foundation Classic Reading Series, featuring one-night only staged readings of Tennessee Williams’ plays at the Ethical Society of Philadelphia, 1906 Rittenhouse Square, Philadelphia
Cat on a Hot Tin Roof, directed by Azuka Theatre, December 10, 2007
Suddenly Last Summer, directed by Lantern Theater, January 7, 2008
The Red Devil Battery Sign, directed by Brat Productions, February 4, 2008
A Streetcar Named Desire, directed by Theatre Exile, March 3, 2008
The Night of the Iguana, directed by BlackStarr Collaborative, April 7, 2008
Pink Bedroom and 27 Wagons Full of Cotton, directed by Flashpoint Theatre, April 14, 2008
Not About Nightingales, directed by Wilma Theater, May 5, 2008
Stairs to the Roof, directed by EgoPo Productions, June 2, 2008
The Glass Menagerie, directed by Temple University, June 20, 2008

References

External links
EgoPo Classic Theater Official Website
EgoPo Classic Theatre on AboutTheArtists.com

Theatre companies in Philadelphia